Räikkönen may refer to:

 Erkki Räikkönen (1900-1961), a Finnish politician
 Ville Räikkönen (born 1972), a biathlete from Finland
 Kimi Räikkönen (born 1979), a race car driver from Finland, and 2007 Formula One world champion.
 Jenni Maria Dahlman-Räikkönen (born 1981) a Finnish model